The 41st Air Refueling Squadron is an inactive United States Air Force unit.  It was last assigned to the 380th Operations Group at Griffiss Air Force Base, New York, where it was inactivated on 15 February 1993.

History

World War II
Activated 1 April 1944 at Dalhart Army Airfield, Texas.  Initially equipped with B-17 Flying Fortresses for training, due to shortage of B-29 Superfortresses.    Moved to Harvard Army Airfield, Nebraska, in August 1944 and equipped with B-29B limited production aircraft.

After completion of training deployed to Central Pacific Area (CPA), assigned to XXI Bomber Command, Northwest Field (Guam) for operational missions.  B-29Bs were standard production aircraft stripped of most defensive guns to increase speed and bomb load, The tail gun was aimed and fired automatically by the new AN/APG-15B radar fire control system that detected the approaching enemy plane and made all the necessary calculations.

Mission of the squadron was the strategic bombardment of the Japanese Home Islands.  Dntered combat on 16 June 1945 with a bombing raid against an airfield on Moen. Flew first mission against the Japanese home islands on 26 June 1945 and afterwards operated principally against the enemy's petroleum industry.  Flew primarily low-level, fast attacks at night using a mixture of high-explosive and incendiary bombs to attack targets.

Flew last combat mission on 15 August 1945, later flew in "Show of Force" mission on 2 September 1945 over Tokyo Bay during formal Japanese Surrender. Inactivated on Guam 15 April 1946, personnel returned to the United States and aircraft sent to storage in Southwest United States.

Air Force Reserve
Allotted to the Air Force Reserve as a Tactical Air Command B-26 Invader light bomb group in 1947.  Inactivated in 1949 due to budget restrictions.

Cold War
Stationed at Griffiss AFB, the squadron provided air refueling to Strategic Air Command and other tactical aircraft using KC-135 Stratotankers (1966–1976) on a worldwide scale.

Lineage

41st Bombardment Squadron
 Constituted as the 41st Bombardment Squadron, Very Heavy on 28 March 1944
 Activated on 1 April 1944
 Inactivated on 10 May 1944
 Activated on 1 June 1944
 Inactivated on 10 June 1946
 Activated in the reserve on 12 July 1947
 Inactivated on 27 June 1949
 Consolidated on 19 September 1985 with the 41st Air Refueling Squadron as the 41st Air Refueling Squadron

41st Air Refueling Squadron
 Constituted as the 41st Air Refueling Squadron, Heavy in 1958
 Activated on 5 January 1959
 Consolidated on 19 September 1985 with the 41st Bombardment Squadron
 Inactivated on 15 February 1993
 Redesignated 41st Expeditionary Air Refueling Squadron and converted to provisional status on 12 June 2002

Assignments
 6th Bombardment Group, 1 April 1944 – 10 May 1944
 501st Bombardment Group, 1 June 1944 – 10 June 1946
 448th Bombardment Group, 12 July 1947 – 27 June 1949.
 4039th Strategic Wing, 5 January 1959
 416th Bombardment Wing, 1 February 1963
 416th Operations Group, 1 September 1991
 380th Operations Group, 1 June 1992 – 15 February 1993

Stations
 Dalhart Army Air Field, Texas, 1 April 1944 – 10 May 1944; 1 June 1944
 Dalhart Army Air Field, Texas, 1 June 1944
 Harvard Army Air Field, Nebraska, 23 August 1944 – 7 March 1945
 Northwest Field (Guam), 14 April 1945 – 10 June 1946
 Long Beach Municipal Airport, California, 12 July 1947 – 27 June 1949.
 Griffiss AFB, New York, 5 January 1959 – 30 May 1992
 Plattsburgh AFB, New York, 1 June 1992 – 15 February 1993
 Air Mobility Command to activate or inactivate as needed, 12 June 2002

Aircraft
 Boeing B-29 Superfortress, 1944–1946
 Douglas B-26 Invader, 1947–1949
 Boeing KC-135 Stratotanker, 1959–1993

References
 Notes

Bibliography

External links

041
Military units and formations established in 1944
Military units and formations established in 1958
1944 establishments in the United States